Retzia is a genus of flowering plants in the family Stilbaceae described as a genus in 1776.

There is only one known species, Retzia capensis, native to the Cape Province region in South Africa.

References

External links
 

Monotypic Lamiales genera
Stilbaceae
Endemic flora of South Africa